Jordon D'Andre Garrick (born 15 July 1998) is a Jamaican professional footballer who plays for Forest Green Rovers.

Born in Jamaica, he moved to England as a child where he began playing football and eventually joined Ossett Albion. In November 2015, he joined Swansea City and made his professional debut four years later.

Early life
Garrick was born in Jamaica before his family settled in the village of Liversedge in Yorkshire, England. He attended Whitcliffe Mount School in Cleckheaton before studying sport and exercise science at Huddersfield New College.

As a teenager, Garrick played football before taking up rugby league at the age of 16. He began playing rugby league for local amateur side Dudley Hill where the coach had ties to Bradford Bulls. He began training with the Bulls, playing as either a fullback or winger. Garrick came close to giving up football after the Bulls expressed an interest in signing him before being persuaded to keep playing by his mother and the manager of his amateur side.

Club career
Garrick played for Northern Premier Division One side Ossett Albion before being encouraged by his coaches to attend a trial with Premier League side Swansea City. The two-week trial proved successful and he signed a two-year deal with the Welsh side, only a year since contemplating leaving football to pursue a rugby league career. He was initially assigned to the club's academy and under-21 development side where he scored eight goals in ten matches during his first season with the under-18s. He made his professional debut for the club as a substitute in place of Barrie McKay during a 3–1 victory over Northampton Town in the first round of the EFL Cup on 13 August 2019. He made his Football League debut a week later during a 3–1 victory over Queens Park Rangers, winning the penalty for his side's second goal. Garrick described his debut as emotional and stated "I had a few tears in my eyes to be honest. It was emotional because it's been a long time coming". He scored his first goal for Swansea in an EFL Cup tie against Cambridge United on 28 August 2019. On 1 February 2021, Garrick joined League One side Swindon Town on loan for the remainder of the 2020–21 season. On 11 August 2022, he would join Lincoln City on a season-long loan deal. He would make his Lincoln City debut on 13 August, coming off the bench against Forest Green Rovers. He was recalled by Swansea City on 5 January 2023 having played 16 times in all competitions for Lincoln City.

On the same day he joined Forest Green Rovers for an undisclosed fee signing an 18 month deal.

Style of play
Garrick has described himself as a player with "pace and skill" and has credited his rugby league background with improving his physicality which he stated "gave me an edge over some players who were older than me in non-league."

Career statistics

References

1998 births
Living people
Jamaican footballers
Ossett Albion A.F.C. players
Swansea City A.F.C. players
Swindon Town F.C. players
Plymouth Argyle F.C. players
Lincoln City F.C. players
Forest Green Rovers F.C. players
English Football League players
Association football wingers